Several palaces are named Ducal Palace (Italian: Palazzo Ducale ) because it was the seat or residence of a duke.

Notable palaces with the name include:

France
Palace of the Dukes of Burgundy, Dijon
Palace of the Dukes of Lorraine, Nancy
Palais ducal de Nevers, Nevers

Italy
Ducal Palace, Alvito
Ducal Palace, Atina
Ducal Palace, Castiglione del Lago
Ducal Palace, Colorno
Doge's Palace, Genoa
Ducal Palace, Guastalla
Ducal Palace, Gubbio
Ducal Palace, Lucca
Ducal Palace, Mantua
Ducal Palace, Massa
Ducal Palace, Modena
Ducal Palace, Parete
Ducal Palace, Pesaro
Ducal Palace, Reggio Emilia
Ducal Palace, Sabbioneta
Ducal Palace, Sassari
Ducal Palace, Sassuolo
Ducal Palace, Serradifalco
Palazzo Ducale, Urbino
Doge's Palace, Venice

Lithuania
Old Kaunas Ducal Palace, Kaunas

Portugal
Ducal Palace, Vila Viçosa
Palace of the Dukes of Braganza, Guimarães
Palace of the Dukes of Cadaval, Évora
Palace of the Dukes of Palmela, Lisbon

Spain
Ducal Palace, Gandia
Ducal Palace, Lerma
Ducal Palace, Pastrana
Palace of the Dukes of Medinaceli, Cogolludo
Palace of the Duke of Uceda, Madrid

See also
Grand Ducal Palace, Luxembourg
Palace of the Grand Dukes of Lithuania
Palace (disambiguation)